Evergreen Township is the name of some places in the U.S. state of Michigan:

 Evergreen Township, Montcalm County, Michigan
 Evergreen Township, Sanilac County, Michigan

Michigan township disambiguation pages